Chor Ke Ghar Chor is a 1978 Indian Hindi-language film directed by Vijay Sadanah. It stars Ashok Kumar and Pran in lead roles with supporting roles played by Randhir Kapoor, Zeenat Aman, Deven Verma and Raza Murad.

Synopsis

When an idol of Devi Maa, which brings immense luck to its owner, is found after many years, it causes a lot of mayhem between two noble families that wish to keep it for themselves.

Cast
Ashok Kumar as Ranjeet Singh
Randhir Kapoor as Birju 
Zeenat Aman as Meena / Maina
Pran as Mangal
Deven Verma as Parvin Bhai / Jaikishan "Jackson" (Double Role) 
Raza Murad as Inspector Shekhar
Sulochana Latkar as Birju's Mother
Helen as Courtesan (Special Appearance) 
Bindu as Princess Ophelia (Special Appearance)
Anwar Hussain as Sher Singh
Preeti Ganguly as Kanta, Parvin Wife
Anoop Kumar as Inspector
Murad as Pratapgarh Thakur Saab
Sajjan as Ramlal, Pratapgarh minister
M.B. Shetty as Shankar, Sher Singh goon
Manmohan as Sher Singh goon
D.K. Sapru as Minister
Chaman Puri as Baba
Birbal 
Radhey Shyam

Soundtrack
Music: Kalyanji–Anandji 
Lyrics: Yogesh

References

External links
 

1978 films
1970s Hindi-language films
Films scored by Kalyanji Anandji